Olaf Heine Johannessen (born 8 July 1961 in Tórshavn) is a Faroese stage and film actor. He finished his education as an actor from the Odense Teater skuespillerskole (now Syddansk Musikkonservatorium og Skuespillerskole) in 1986. He works as an actor on stage in Denmark and Germany and as a film actor in Danish TV-series and films. 

After finishing his education Johannessen was employed at the Aarhus Teater, where he played the main role in the drama Lykke-Peer (1988) and the title role in Hamlet (1992) and the title role in Roberto Zucco. In 1994 he started working at the Royal Danish Theatre, where he worked until he in 2002 started working as a freelance actor in various theatres in Denmark and Germany. He has played in Danish TV-series like playing the role as the prime minister Kristian Kamper in The Killing (Danish TV series) (Danish title: Forbrydelsen), third series. From 2013 to 2014 he played the role as Peer Gynt in the Schauspielhaus Düsseldorf, directed by Staffan Valdemar Holm. From 2011 to 2014 he worked as a stage actor at the same theatre playing the role as Michel Houellebecq in the play Karte und Gebiet, directed by Falk Richter. In 2014 he played the role as Adolf Eichmann on the Betty Nansen Teatret in the play Samtale før døden (Dialogue before death), written by Adam Price, directed by Peter Langdal.

Olaf Johannessen is the son of theater instructor Eyðun Johannessen and brother of the actor Annika Johannessen. His father is Faroese, his mother, Tove Jacobsen, is Danish. He grew up in Tórshavn, Faroe Islands and in Denmark. His current partner is the Faroese actress and directress Marita Dalsgaard with whom he has two children. He has three other children from a previous marriage.

Theatre roles in selection

Filmography

Awards and recognition 
 2004: Olaf Poulsens Mindelegat
 2009: Poul Reumerts Mindelegat
 2010: Lauritzen Award
 2013: Robert Award for best male supporting role in TV-series
 2013: Der Faust (category actor in play) - nominated as the best actor
 2013: Nominated to the Teaterpokalen
 3 December 2013: Knight of the Order of the Dannebrog
 2014: Received the Ole Haslunds kunstnerlegat
 2014: Received the Teaterpokalen
 2014: Elected as Årets skuespiller (Best Danish male actor of the year) by Berlingske.
 2015: Received the Reumert prize for best leading role (male) in Samtale før døden and Mefisto, Betty Nansen Teatret, and Heksejagt, Det Kongelige Teater
 2016: Received the Reumert prize for best leading role (male) in  Puntila, Det Kongelige Teater.

References 

Danish male stage actors
Faroese male actors
Danish male actors
20th-century Danish male actors
21st-century Danish male actors
People from Tórshavn
1961 births
Living people